William Theodore Ribbs Jr. (born January 3, 1955) is a retired American race car driver, racing owner, and sport shooter known for being the first African-American man to have tested a Formula One car (he did so in 1986) and to compete in the Indianapolis 500 (tested in 1985, raced in 1991 and 1993). Ribbs competed in many forms of auto racing, including the Trans-Am Series, IndyCar, Champ Car, IMSA, and the NASCAR Cup Series and Gander Outdoors Truck Series. After retiring, he became a sport shooter in the National Sporting Clays Association.

Ribbs saw his most success in the Trans-Am Series, winning 17 races while driving for Dan Gurney and Jack Roush.

Biography

Ribbs grew up in San Jose, California as one of five children in a middle-class family. His father William "Bunny" Ribbs, Sr. was a plumbing contractor and amateur sportscar racer and was friends and neighbors with Indy Car driver Joe Leonard. Ribbs was nearly killed at eight years old when an out-of-control car at a race struck him. As a teenager, Ribbs would take his car out in the California mountains at high speeds, frequently stopped by police for reckless driving. Ribbs proceeded to enter a racing school at the age of 21. Following his graduation from high school in 1975, Ribbs moved to Europe to compete. In 1977, Ribbs won the Dunlop/Autosport Star of Tomorrow FF1600 in his first year of competition, winning six races in eleven starts with Mike Eastick's Scorpion Racing School. Ribbs returned to the United States in 1978, making his debut in the Formula Atlantic open-wheel series at Long Beach on April 1, finishing 10th after running as high as 4th.

In May 1978, Charlotte Motor Speedway president and race promoter Humpy Wheeler entered Ribbs to drive a NASCAR Winston Cup car in the World 600 at Charlotte in an effort to attract black fans to his racetrack. Ribbs was partnered with veteran crew chief Harry Hyde. After being initially rejected by track officials due to a lack of stock car experience, and when the Dodge Magnum Ribbs was supposed to drive was committed to another driver, Wheeler set Ribbs up with owner Will Cronkite and a Bud Moore Engineering-built Ford Torino.  Cronkite replaced him with future champion Dale Earnhardt.

Ribbs returned to the Formula Atlantic series in 1981, winning the pole in the Long Beach Formula Atlantic race in 1982. The following year, Ribbs moved to the SCCA Trans-Am Series, driving Chevrolet Camaros with sponsorship from Budweiser. Ribbs won five races and was honored as Pro Rookie of the Year, while his teammate David Hobbs won the series championship. Ribbs won four races in 1984 driving factory-backed Mercury Capris for Roush Racing.

Ribbs' made his first attempt at the Indianapolis 500 in 1985, which ended in controversy when during testing he topped out at 170 miles per hour while other rookie drivers were running laps above 200 miles per hour. Ribbs proceeded to withdraw from the race altogether. The deal had been put together in part by boxing promoter Don King, who Ribbs hired to manage him, with sponsorship from Miller Brewing Company, but with a second hand Cosworth machine from Arie Luyendyk.

Ribbs attempted NASCAR again in 1986, running three races in the No. 30 Red Roof Inns car owned by DiGard Motorsports. His best finish came at his debut, a 22nd at North Wilkesboro Speedway. Also in 1986, Ribbs became the first black person to drive a Formula One car, when he tested for the Bernie Ecclestone-owned Brabham team at the Autódromo do Estoril, Portugal. Ultimately, Ribbs was not given the drive for the upcoming season. In 1987, Ribbs began driving Toyota Celicas for Dan Gurney in the IMSA GT Championship, winning four races.

In 1990, Ribbs joined the CART circuit in a car funded in-part by comedian Bill Cosby. Ribbs had one top-10 event that season. He was involved in an unfortunate incident in Vancouver when a group of track marshals ran onto the track to assist Ross Bentley who had stalled, however, one of the marshals ran in front of Ribbs' car and the marshal was killed in the impact.

In 1991, he became the first African-American to qualify for the Indianapolis 500.  He raced there a second time in 1993. In 1994, he continued in the CART series with the team, finishing in the top 10 at the Michigan International Speedway  and New Hampshire International Speedway  races.

In 1999, Ribbs raced in an Indy Racing League IndyCar Series event at Las Vegas Motor Speedway for McCormack Motorsports as a try-out to join the team full-time in 2000. However he crashed on lap four and finished in 26th and last place. After three top-10s the Trans-Am Series in 2000, Ribbs signed to drive the No. 8 Dodge Ram for Bobby Hamilton Racing in the NASCAR Craftsman Truck Series. Driving 23 out of 24 races, Ribbs had a best finish of 13th, and finished 16th in points.

In May 2011, Ribbs announced he had formed Willy T. Ribbs Racing to campaign former biracial NASCAR driver Chase Austin in the Firestone Indy Lights' Freedom 100 at the Indianapolis Motor Speedway, which coincided with Ribbs' 20th anniversary of breaking the color barrier at Indy. Ribbs himself came out of retirement to drive for the team in the Baltimore GP.

Among Ribbs' career highlights are winning the pole for the Formula Atlantic race at the 1982 Long Beach Grand Prix, IMSA GTO Driver of the Year 1987-88, and Trans Am Series Driver of the Year 1983. Ribbs won 17 Trans Am and 10 IMSA GTO races. He was enshrined on Long Beach Walk of Fame.

In 2019, Ribbs won the Indy Legends Charity Pro–Am Championship with co-driver Ed Sevadjian.

After racing 
After retiring from racing, Ribbs turned to professional shooting, specializing in sporting clays. His son Theodore Ribbs is a professional sport shooter. Ribbs married hotel management executive Stephanie Bauer in August 2018.

Controversy
Ribbs, an outspoken Black man (and not an obsequious "Stepin Fetchit," as Ribbs termed the sort of Black man the racing community wanted) had received criticism for his forthrightness during his career, sometimes from other African Americans in auto racing. Black car owner Leonard T. Miller, felt Ribbs was not the best representative of the Black community due to his outspoken nature. Ribbs has also spoken negatively about his experience in NASCAR. In May 2006, a newspaper column by Jason Whitlock of Knight-Ridder quoted Ribbs detailing his criticism of NASCAR and his lauding of the Indianapolis 500. Ribbs created controversy by referring to NASCAR as "Al-Qaida", "Neckcar", and WWE.

In 1984, during a warm-up session at the SCCA Trans-Am Series season opener at Road Atlanta, Ribbs was fined $1,000 for throwing a punch at fellow driver Bob Lobenberg, after the two drivers made contact on the track. In 1987 following a race at Portland International Raceway, Ribbs was suspended by the International Motor Sports Association for one month after throwing a punch at driver Scott Pruett.

In media
In the Disney Channel cartoon The Proud Family and its 2021 Disney+ reboot The Proud Family: Louder and Prouder, Penny Proud and her friends attend "Willy T. Ribbs Middle School," where the mascot is the "Racer."

Ribbs was featured in the 2020 documentary Uppity: The Willy T. Ribbs Story, which released on Netflix.

After driving in the 2021 SRX Series, Ribbs became a roving reporter for the 2022 season.

Motorsports career results

American open–wheel racing results
(key)

PPG Indycar Series
(key) (Races in bold indicate pole position)

 1 Did not appear
 2 Withdrew from rookie orientation

Indianapolis 500

Indy Racing League
(key) (Races in bold indicate pole position)

Indy Lights

NASCAR
(key) (Bold – Pole position awarded by qualifying time. Italics – Pole position earned by points standings or practice time. * – Most laps led.)

Winston Cup Series

Craftsman Truck Series

Superstar Racing Experience
(key) * – Most laps led. 1 – Heat 1 winner. 2 – Heat 2 winner.

 Season still in progress

See also
 Wendell Scott, NASCAR driver and first African-American race winner.
 Lewis Hamilton, first British driver of black and white mixed background to compete in a Formula One Grand Prix, win a race, and become World Drivers' Champion.

References

External links
 
 
 Willy T. Ribbs at The HistoryMakers

Living people
1955 births
Sportspeople from San Jose, California
Racing drivers from California
Racing drivers from San Jose, California
Indianapolis 500 drivers
Champ Car drivers
IndyCar Series drivers
Indy Lights drivers
Atlantic Championship drivers
NASCAR drivers
IMSA GT Championship drivers
Trans-Am Series drivers
Sporting clays shooters
American male sport shooters
African-American racing drivers
African-American IndyCar Series drivers
21st-century African-American people
20th-century African-American sportspeople
Walker Racing drivers